Keep Quiet may refer to:

Music
Keep Quiet (album), a 2012 album by Sons
Keep Quiet, 2007 EP by Lab Partners
"Keep Quiet", song from 2007 BarlowGirl album How Can We Be Silent
"Keep Quiet", a song by The Protomen from their 2009 album Act II: The Father of Death
"Keep Quiet", song from 2010 Hot Chip album One Life Stand

Other uses
Keep Quiet (film), a 2016 feature documentary by AJH Films and Passion Pictures
Keep Quiet, a 2014 novel by Lisa Scottoline